Green Valley Township is a township in Becker County, Minnesota, United States.  The population was 346 as of the 2000 census.

History
Green Valley Township was organized in 1886. It was named for the green valley of the Shell River.

Geography
The Shell River flows southeastwardly through the township, and the Blueberry River has its headwaters in the township.

Lakes
 Blueberry Lake
 Brush Lake
 Knutson Lake
 Little Lake
 Little Long Lake
 Little Round Lake
 Shipman Lake

Adjacent townships
 Osage Township (north)
 Todd Township, Hubbard County (northeast)
 Straight River Township, Hubbard County (east)
 Blueberry Township, Wadena County (southeast)
 Runeberg Township (south)
 Spruce Grove Township (southwest)
 Wolf Lake Township (west)
 Carsonville Township (northwest)

Cemeteries
The township contains Green Valley Cemetery.

Demographics
As of the census of 2000, there were 346 people, 124 households, and 90 families residing in the township.  The population density was 9.8 people per square mile (3.8/km2).  There were 165 housing units at an average density of 4.7/sq mi (1.8/km2).  The racial makeup of the township was 95.95% White, 1.16% Native American, 0.87% from other races, and 2.02% from two or more races. Hispanic or Latino of any race were 1.73% of the population.

There were 124 households, out of which 33.9% had children under the age of 18 living with them, 62.1% were married couples living together, 4.8% had a female householder with no husband present, and 27.4% were non-families. 25.0% of all households were made up of individuals, and 9.7% had someone living alone who was 65 years of age or older.  The average household size was 2.79 and the average family size was 3.40.

In the township the population was spread out, with 29.5% under the age of 18, 7.5% from 18 to 24, 23.1% from 25 to 44, 26.9% from 45 to 64, and 13.0% who were 65 years of age or older.  The median age was 39 years. For every 100 females, there were 107.2 males.  For every 100 females age 18 and over, there were 112.2 males.

The median income for a household in the township was $40,417, and the median income for a family was $41,806. Males had a median income of $28,542 versus $18,750 for females. The per capita income for the township was $15,149.  About 11.4% of families and 13.7% of the population were below the poverty line, including 5.1% of those under age 18 and 34.5% of those age 65 or over.

References
 United States National Atlas
 United States Census Bureau 2007 TIGER/Line Shapefiles
 United States Board on Geographic Names (GNIS)

Townships in Becker County, Minnesota
Townships in Minnesota